The St. Boniface Seals were a Canadian Junior Hockey Team in the Manitoba Junior Hockey League from 1934 to 1939.  

The 1938 St. Boniface Seals beat the defending National Champion Winnipeg Monarchs for the Turnbull Cup, the Thunder Bay champs Port Arthur for the Abbott Cup, before going on to defeat Oshawa Generals to win the Memorial Cup championship.

Team Roster: Fred Barker, Herb Burron, Pete Couture, Fred Yedon, J. Crawford, George Gordon, Herm Gruhn, Ed Haverstock, Bert Janke, Mike Kryschuk, Bill McGregor, Jack Messett, Cliff Murchison Jr., Cliff Murchison Sr., Frank Nicol, Gil Paulley, Billy Reay, Doc Roy, Geo. Schettler, Wally Stanowski, Jack Simpson, Doug Webb.

The 1938 St. Boniface Seals were inducted into the Manitoba Hockey Hall of Fame in the team category.

The Seals were renamed the Athletics in 1939 and played until 1945.

Championships
1938 Memorial Cup Champions

NHL Alumni
 William Meronek
 Terry Reardon
 Billy Reay
 Wally Stanowski

External links
1938 St. Boniface Seals at Manitoba Hockey Hall of Fame

Defunct Manitoba Junior Hockey League teams
Ice hockey teams in Winnipeg
Saint Boniface, Winnipeg